Christian Capone (born 28 April 1999) is an Italian professional footballer who plays as a forward for  club Reggiana on loan from Atalanta.

Club career

Atalanta 
Born in Vigevano, Capone began his career at Serie A side Atalanta. He made his first team debut on 30 November 2016, starting in a 3–0 Coppa Italia home win against Pescara.

Loan to Pescara 
On 1 July 2017, Capone was signed by Serie B side Pescara with a season-long loan deal. On 6 August, Capone made his debut for Pescara in the second round of Coppa Italia as a starter in a 5–3 home win, after extra-time, against Triestina, he played the entire match. One week later he scored his first professional goal in the third round in the 30th minute of a 3–1 away win over Brescia. On 27 August, Capone made his debut in Serie B for Pescara in a 5–1 home win over Foggia, he was replaced by Ahmad Benali in the 46th minute. On 16 September, Capone scored his first goal in Serie B in the 25th minute of a 2–2 away draw against Salernitana. Three days later, he played his first entire match in Serie B and he scored his second goal in the 17th minute of a 2–2 home draw against Virtus Entella. Capone ended his loan to Pescara with 26 appearances, 7 goals and 3 assists.

On 17 August 2018, Capone return on loan to Pescara until the end of 2018–19 Serie B season. On 25 August he started his second season at Pescara as a substitute replacing Pepìn in the 85th minute of a 1–1 away draw against Cremonese. On 22 September he played his first match as a starter of the season, a 1–0 home win over Foggia, he was replaced by Mirko Antonucci in the 57th minute. Capone ended his loan to Pescara with 12 appearances, including only 2 of them as a starter and 1 assist, but he did not play any entire match during his second loan.

Loan to Perugia 
On 13 July 2019, Capone was loaned to Serie B club Perugia until the end of the season. On 11 August he made his debut for Perugia in a 1–0 home win over Triestina in the second round of Coppa Italia, he played the entire match. On 25 August he made his league debut as a substitute replacing Federico Melchiorri in the 64th minute of a 2–1 home win over ChievoVerona. Six days later he played his first match as a starter in Serie B for the club, a 1–0 away win over Livorno, he was replaced by Federico Melchiorri in the 54th minute. On 1 December he scored his first goal for Perugia in the 34th minute of a 3–1 home win over Pescara. Three weeks later, on 21 December, he scored his second goal in the 61 st minute of a 2–1 home win over Virtus Entella. Capone ended his loan to Perugia with 24 appearances and 2 goals.

Loan to Pescara 
On 24 September 2020, Capone returned to Serie B side Pescara on a season-long loan deal. Two days later, on 26 September, he made his seasonal debut for the club as a substitute replacing Cristian Galano for the last 6 minutes of a 0–0 home draw against ChievoVerona. On 20 October he played his first entire match, a 4–0 away defeat against Venezia. Seven months later, on 4 May 2021, Capone scored his first goal of the season and the winning goal of the match in the 8th minute of a 1–0 home win over Reggiana. Capone ended his second loan to Pescara with 22 appearances, on 10 as a starter and 1 goal, however Pescara was relegated in Serie C.

Loan to Ternana 
On 27 July 2021, he joined newly-promoted Serie B club Ternana on loan with an option to buy.

Loan to Südtirol
On 3 August 2022, Capone joined Südtirol in Serie B on loan.

Loan to Reggiana
On 5 January 2023, Capone moved on a new loan to Reggiana in Serie C.

International career
Capone has been capped by Italy at U15, U16, U17, U18 levels, and also reached the final of the 2018 UEFA European Under-19 Championship with the U19 side.

On 25 May 2018 he made his debut with the Italy U21 team in a 3–2 friendly loss against Portugal, and on 29 May, he scored his first goal with the U21 side in a friendly match against France.

Career statistics

Club

Honours
Italy U19
UEFA European Under-19 Championship runner-up: 2018

Italy U20
FIFA U-20 World Cup fourth place: 2019

References

External links

1999 births
People from Vigevano
Sportspeople from the Province of Pavia
Footballers from Lombardy
Living people
Italian footballers
Association football forwards
Italy youth international footballers
Atalanta B.C. players
Delfino Pescara 1936 players
A.C. Perugia Calcio players
Ternana Calcio players
F.C. Südtirol players
A.C. Reggiana 1919 players
Serie B players